Gau (pronounced ) is an island belonging to Fiji's Lomaiviti archipelago.

The Gau Highlands Important Bird Area is an area covering the entire forested interior (just over 50% of the entire island) and measures . It contains populations of the critically endangered Fiji petrel, and vulnerable shy ground-dove and collared petrel. The Fiji petrel's nesting habitat on the island contributes to its national significance as outlined in Fiji's Biodiversity Strategy and Action Plan.

It has one airstrip at Lovu, on the southern tip of the island, which receives planes from Nausori International Airport. There are 16 villages on the island: Yadua, Vadra Vadra, Lovu, Levuka-i-Gau, Nukuloa, Nawaikama, Somosomo, Sawaeke (the chiefly village), Navukailagi, Qarani, Vione, Lekanai, Vanuaso, Nacavanadi, Malawai and Lamiti. There is one Secondary School on the island in Nawaikama, which also hosts hot springs nearby. Gau Island is widely regarded as one of the best Kava (Yaqona) strains in Fiji.

A marine research facility was established on Naviavia beach on the western coast of Gau in 2005 by the UK-based non-governmental organization Frontier, commissioned by Dr. Joeli Veitayaki of the University of South Pacific, a native of Malawai on the eastern coast.

Rugby sevens former player-coach of the Fijian national Sevens Team Waisale Serevi is a native of Qarani, a small village to the northwest, which also contains a post office and nursing station.

The first King of Fiji Seru Epenisa Cakobau grew up on the island, despite being born on the nearby island Nairai.

References

Islands of Fiji
Lomaiviti Province
Preliminary Register of Sites of National Significance in Fiji
Important Bird Areas of Fiji